Wilma Newhoudt-Druchen is a South African politician, and the country's first Deaf female Member of Parliament. She attended Gallaudet University and was elected the vice-president of the World Federation of the Deaf in 2011.

References

Year of birth missing (living people)
Living people
Members of the National Assembly of South Africa
Gallaudet University alumni
Deaf politicians
South African deaf people
Women members of the National Assembly of South Africa